Yassin Chadili (born 10 August 1988) is a French professional footballer who currently plays as a midfielder. He has previously played for Boulogne, where he made 17 appearances in Ligue 2, and Épinal.

Personal life
Chadili as born in France and is of Moroccan descent.

Career statistics

References

External links
 
 
 

1988 births
Living people
Sportspeople from Dunkirk
French footballers
French sportspeople of Moroccan descent
Association football midfielders
US Boulogne players
SAS Épinal players
CS Sedan Ardennes players
Olympique Grande-Synthe players
Ligue 2 players
Championnat National players
Championnat National 2 players
Championnat National 3 players
Footballers from Hauts-de-France